Sultan Husain (Arabic:سلطان حسين) (born 17 September 1995) is an Emirati footballer. He currently plays as a fullback for Baniyas.

Career

Youth career
Sultan Husain started his career at Al Rams and is a product of the Al Rams's youth system. and joined the youth Emirates Club in 2011 .

Emirates Club
On 8 May 2016, Sultan Husain made his professional debut for Emirates Club against Al Ain in the Pro League.

Baniyas
On 24 May 2020, he left Emirates Club and signed with Baniyas.

External links

References

1995 births
Living people
Emirati footballers
Al Rams Club players
Emirates Club players
Baniyas Club players
UAE Pro League players
UAE First Division League players
Association football fullbacks
Place of birth missing (living people)